Irene Karlijn (Ireen) Wüst (born 1 April 1986) is a Dutch former long track speed skater of German ancestry. Wüst became the most successful speed skating Olympian ever by achieving at least one gold medal in each of five consecutive Winter Olympic appearances. Wüst is also the only athlete to win an individual gold medal in five consecutive Olympics, Summer or Winter.

Wüst is both the youngest Dutch Olympic gold medalist and the oldest speed skating gold medalist in the history of the Winter Games. At the age of nineteen, on 12 February 2006, she won the gold medal at the 2006 Winter Olympic Games 3000 metre event; four years later at the 2010 Winter Olympic Games she won the 1500 metre event; at the 2014 Winter Olympic Games she won two gold and three silver medals, making her the most decorated athlete at the Sochi Games. Following her record sixth speed skating gold medal in the 1500 metres and bronze in the team pursuit event at the 2022 Winter Olympics she has won a record thirteen Olympic medals, more than any other speed skater, making her the most successful athlete of the Netherlands at the Olympics. She is also a seven-time world allround champion, a fifteen-time world single distance champion, and a five-time European allround champion. In 2014, she was elected by Reuters as the Sportswoman of the World.

Skating career
Wüst debuted at the 2004 KNSB Dutch Single Distance Championships in November 2003 with ninth place in both the 500m and 1500m events. At the end of the season, she won the silver medal in the world junior championships in Roseville, Minnesota, USA. The following season she qualified for the 2004–05 World Cup during the 2005 KNSB Dutch Single Distance Championships with fifth place in the 1000m and fourth place in the 1500m. With a third place at the 2005 KNSB Dutch Allround Championships, she qualified for her first international senior tournament, the 2005 European Championships in Heerenveen. There she came fourth and secured a spot in the Dutch team for the 2005 World Allround Championships in Moscow, Russia, where she finished in fifth place. She then became World Junior Champion in Seinäjoki, Finland.

Season 2005–2006
Before the start of the season, Wüst signed a deal with TVM and started training under the guidance of Gerard Kemkers. At the 2006 KNSB Dutch Single Distance Championships, which also served as the Olympic Trials, Wüst won the 1000m, 1500m, and 3000m, which gave her a spot in the Dutch Olympic Team for the 2006 Winter Olympics in Turin. Before the Olympics, she started in the 2006 European Championships in Hamar, where she won the bronze medal behind Claudia Pechstein of Germany and teammate Renate Groenewold.

Olympic Games in Turin
At the 2006 Olympics, her first distance was the 3000 metres where Wüst beat Groenewold and Cindy Klassen of Canada for the gold medal and became The Netherlands' youngest ever Winter Olympics champion. She missed out on the podium in the 1000 metres, finishing fourth. At her last event, the 1500 metres, she won a bronze medal behind Cindy Klassen and Kristina Groves of Canada. At her last event of the season, the 2006 World Allround Championships, Wüst finished fourth after she had been ill a few days before the tournament.

After the end of the season, Wüst was elected as the best Dutch Sportswoman of the Year 2006. She was also elected female skater of the year.

Season 2006–2007
Wüst started the season with two titles and one second place at the 2007 Dutch Distance Championships. She also won the 2007 Dutch Allround Championships. At the 2007 European Championships, Wüst led the championships after 3 of 4 distances but was beaten by Martina Sáblíková. The following weekend she competed in the 2007 World Sprint Speed Skating Championships in Hamar, again winning the silver medal. She became World Allround Champion during the 2007 World Allround Championships for the home crowd in Heerenveen. She won the 2006–07 World Cup in the 1500 m after winning two of the six races, as well as the 1000 m during the World Cup Final in Calgary. At the 2007 World Distance Championships, she won a gold medal in the 1000 m, breaking the national record, and another in the 1500 m. With Renate Groenewold and Paulien van Deutekom, she won silver in the team pursuit behind Canada.

Season 2007–2008
After a difficult start to the season, Wüst won the European allround title in January 2008. Her main competitor this year was Paulien van Deutekom. Wüst finished second behind van Deutekom during the World Allround Championships in Berlin. In Nagano during the 2008 World Distance Championships, she won the gold medal in the team pursuit alongside Groenewold and Van Deutekom. Wüst won only one world race this season, the 1500m in Hamar.

2010 Olympic Games in Vancouver
At the 2010 Winter Olympics she won a gold medal in the 1500 metres.

2014 Olympic Games in Sochi

At the 2014 Winter Olympics, she won gold medals in the 3000 metres and in the team pursuit, and silver medals in the 1000m, 1500m and 5000m.

2018 Olympic Games in Pyeongchang
At the 2018 Winter Olympics, she won a gold medal in the 1500 metres and a silver medal in the 3000 metres. Her 1500 m gold medal was her fourth consecutive medal at this distance at the Olympics, and this was the fourth Olympics in a row in which she won an individual gold medal, the first time this was achieved by a Winter Olympian. She also became the second speed skater to win the Olympic 1500 metres twice (after Lidiya Skoblikova in 1960 and 1964), and the first Dutch athlete to win five gold medals and ten medals overall at the Olympics. She also became the first speed skater, male or female, to win eleven Olympic medals, and the first female Winter Olympian to win nine individual medals.

2022 Olympic Games in Beijing 
At the 2022 Winter Olympics, she won a gold medal in the 1500 metres, setting a new Olympic record time and becoming the first athlete to earn individual gold medals at five different Olympics (spanning 16 years).

Personal records

She is currently in 5th position on the Adelskalender with a score of 156.436 points.

Tournament overview

Source:

World Cup overview

Source:

– = Did not participate
* = 5000m
(b) = Division B
DNF = Did not finish
DQ = Disqualified
NC = No classification
DNQ =Did not qualify

Medals won
updated December 2021

Personal life
On 1 March 2006, Wüst was awarded as Knight of the Order of the Netherlands Lion for services to sport, i.e., winning the women's 3000 m speed skating competition at the 2006 Winter Olympics in Turin. On 22 February 2022, she was further appointed a Commander of the Order of Orange-Nassau for her outstanding performance in sport in general over the years and winning the women's 1500 m speed skating competition at the 2022 Winter Olympics in Beijing.

Wüst is bisexual and first discussed being in a relationship with a woman in a 2009 Dutch interview.

The umlaut "ü" in her family name, which is normally not used in Dutch, stems from a German ancestor who settled as a merchant in the Friesian town of Dokkum at the end of the 18th century.

See also
List of multiple Olympic gold medalists

References

External links

Photos of Ireen Wüst

1986 births
Dutch female speed skaters
Speed skaters at the 2006 Winter Olympics
Speed skaters at the 2010 Winter Olympics
Speed skaters at the 2014 Winter Olympics
Speed skaters at the 2018 Winter Olympics
Speed skaters at the 2022 Winter Olympics
Olympic speed skaters of the Netherlands
Medalists at the 2006 Winter Olympics
Medalists at the 2010 Winter Olympics
Medalists at the 2014 Winter Olympics
Medalists at the 2018 Winter Olympics
Medalists at the 2022 Winter Olympics
Olympic medalists in speed skating
Olympic gold medalists for the Netherlands
Olympic silver medalists for the Netherlands
Olympic bronze medalists for the Netherlands
Bisexual sportspeople
Bisexual women
Dutch LGBT sportspeople
People from Goirle
Sportspeople from North Brabant
Living people
Dutch people of German descent
World Allround Speed Skating Championships medalists
World Single Distances Speed Skating Championships medalists
World Sprint Speed Skating Championships medalists
LGBT speed skaters